Kimball is a city in and county seat of Kimball County, Nebraska, United States. The population was 2,290 at the 2020 census.

History
Kimball was originally called Antelopeville, and under the latter name was established circa 1870 when the Union Pacific Railroad was extended to that point.  It initially consisted of a telegraph and coal station with a siding and section house. It was renamed in 1885 in honor of Thomas Kimball, a railroad official. Kimball was incorporated in 1888.

Geography

Kimball is located at  (41.233693, -103.659463), in the southwestern Panhandle.

It is marked by a small monument.

Demographics

2010 census

As of the census of 2010, there were 2,496 people, 1,110 households, and 651 families living in the city. The racial makeup of the city was 93.8% White, 0.2% African American, 1.5% Native American, 0.4% Asian, 0.1% Pacific Islander, 1.6% from other races, and 2.5% from two or more races. Hispanic or Latino of any race were 7.1% of the population.

There were 1,110 households, of which 26.5% had children under the age of 18 living with them, 45.9% were married couples living together, 8.6% had a female householder with no husband present, 4.1% had a male householder with no wife present, and 41.4% were non-families. 36.8% of all households were made up of individuals, and 18.8% had someone living alone who was 65 years of age or older. The average household size was 2.21 and the average family size was 2.88.

The median age in the city was 44.8 years. 23.2% of residents were under the age of 18; 7.1% were between the ages of 18 and 24; 20% were from 25 to 44; 26.2% were from 45 to 64; and 23.6% were 65 years of age or older. The gender makeup of the city was 48.8% male and 51.2% female.

2000 census
As of the census of 2000, there were 2,559 people, 1,110 households, and 700 families living in the city. The population density was 1,665.8 people per square mile (641.6/km). There were 1,210 housing units at an average density of 787.6 per square mile (303.4/km). The racial makeup of the city was 96.25% White, 0.35% African American, 1.06% Native American, 0.16% Asian, 0.39% from other races, and 1.80% from two or more races. Hispanic or Latino of any race were 3.52% of the population.

There were 1,110 households, out of which 25.4% had children under the age of 18 living with them, 51.8% were married couples living together, 8.0% had a female householder with no husband present, and 36.9% were non-families. 33.7% of all households were made up of individuals, and 18.0% had someone living alone who was 65 years of age or older. The average household size was 2.25 and the average family size was 2.84.

In the city, the population was spread out, with 24.1% under the age of 18, 6.1% from 18 to 24, 23.1% from 25 to 44, 23.3% from 45 to 64, and 23.4% who were 65 years of age or older. The median age was 43 years. For every 100 females, there were 90.0 males. For every 100 females age 18 and over, there were 86.4 males.

As of 2000, the median income for a household in the city was $29,984, and the median income for a family was $37,273. Males had a median income of $29,222 versus $18,198 for females. The per capita income for the city was $18,762. About 7.9% of families and 10.2% of the population were below the poverty line, including 12.6% of those under age 18 and 6.6% of those age 65 or over.

Climate
Kimball, like much of western Nebraska, has a climate on the border between humid continental (Köppen Dfa/Dfb/Dwa/Dwb) and cool semi-arid (BSk). The climate is characterised by cold and extremely variable winters that can range from quite warm days due to chinook winds to bitter cold under the influence of Arctic air from Canada. Spring is also variable, but heats up gradually, and features frequent thunderstorms that make this the wettest time of year, whilst summer is very warm to hot and can range from extremes of heat and drought to cooler weather with heavy rainfall. The fall season is drier than the spring and gradually cools down, although warm spells due to the chinook are always possible.

Economy 

The Kimball Wind Farm was upgraded from 10.5 to 30MW in 2018. Its annual power generation capacity is sufficient for approximately 11,000 homes.

A number of small oil and gas producers are based in Kimball.

Media
The weekly Western Nebraska Observer, serving Kimball and Banner counties, is published in Kimball.

Parks and recreation

Kimball has two parks: City Park and Gotte Park.  The latter includes the municipal swimming pool.  The 18-hole Four Winds Golf Course is also operated by the city parks and recreation department.

Transportation
Interstate 80 runs east–west, just south of Kimball; there is an exit for the city. U.S. Route 30 runs east–west through the city. Nebraska Highway 71 runs north–south through Kimball.

The Kimball County Shuttle provides public transportation. The shuttle is equipped for wheelchair accessibility.

Notable people
 Arthur L. Miller, Congressman and Mayor of Kimball 1933-34

References

External links

 City of Kimball

Cities in Nebraska
Cities in Kimball County, Nebraska
County seats in Nebraska